Building control may refer to:
 Building code, a set of standards for the construction of buildings
 Building control body, an organisation enforcing construction standards in England and Wales
 Building automation, automated control of a building through a Building Management System